Carlos Eduardo González Ambríz (born 5 November 1973) is a Mexican former footballer who played in the Mexican top flight.

Career
He had his best years playing for Necaxa, where he played the final match of the 2002 season against Club América. He also played for Tampico Madero, his hometown team, Querétaro and Monterrey.

Earlier, he played for the Mexican youth team alongside players such as Oswaldo Sánchez and Duilio Davino.

References

External links
Querétaro FC player page

1973 births
Living people
Footballers from Tamaulipas
Sportspeople from Tampico, Tamaulipas
Mexican footballers
Association football defenders
C.F. Monterrey players
Querétaro F.C. footballers
Club Necaxa footballers
Tampico Madero F.C. footballers
Liga MX players